"Stir It Up" is a song composed by Bob Marley in 1967 and first recorded by the group Bob Marley and the Wailers that year and issued as a single. It was later covered by American singer Johnny Nash on his 1972 album I Can See Clearly Now. The following year, Marley and the Wailers re-recorded the song for their album Catch a Fire.

The band performed "Stir It Up" on The Old Grey Whistle Test in 1973 during their first trip to the UK, singing live over a Chris Blackwell overdubbed backing track.

"Stir It Up" was the first Marley written song to be successful outside Jamaica. Another tune written by Bob Marley, "I Shot The Sheriff", was covered by Eric Clapton on the album 461 Ocean Boulevard, July 1974. Marley's first international hit recorded by him, "No Woman No Cry", was released on the Bob Marley and the Wailers album Live!, December 1975.

Certifications (Bob Marley & The Wailers version)

Chart history (Johnny Nash cover)

Weekly charts

Year-end charts

The Black Sorrows' version

In September 1993, Australian band The Black Sorrows released a version of the song. It became a hit, peaking at number 58 in Australia, number 20 in New Zealand (where it is the band's highest charting single), and number nine in Iceland. At the ARIA Music Awards of 1994, Joe Camilleri was nominated for Producer of the Year for his work on this song, losing out to Tony Cohen.

Track listing
CD single (Columbia 660 105-2)
 "Stir It Up" – 3:34	
 "Ain't Love the Strangest Thing" (acoustic) – 4:10	
 "Come On, Come On" (acoustic) – 2:50

Charts

Haddaway version

In 1994, Trinidadian-German Eurodance artist Haddaway released his version of "Stir It Up" as the second single from his debut album, The Album (1993). It was only released in the US.

Critical reception
Troy J. Augusto from Cash Box wrote, "Hot new Arista singer (where have we heard that one before?) Haddaway looks to recover from the disappointment of last single, “Life”, with this solid cover of one of Bob Marley’s most beloved songs. The cut’s producers add a contemporary, almost techno-pop feel to the song (Marley’s surely bumpin’ in his grave!), but the tune’s solid arrangement and Haddaway’s likable voice translate to a crossover hit waiting to happen. Hit radio will stir it up soon."

Track listing
 12", US (1994)
"Stir It Up" (Long Version) — 6:20
"Rock My Heart" (Extended Mix) — 5:58
"Rock My Heart" (Celebration Mix) — 5:48

 CD single, US (1994)
"Stir It Up" (Single Version) — 4:16
"Rock My Heart" (Extended Mix) — 5:58
"When The Feeling's Gone" — 4:15

 Cassette single, US (1994)
"Stir It Up" (Long Version)
"Stir It Up" (Single Version)
"Rock My Heart" (Extended Mix)

References

1967 songs
Bob Marley songs
Haddaway songs
Johnny Nash songs
Songs written by Bob Marley
The Black Sorrows songs
Epic Records singles
1972 singles
1973 singles
1993 singles
1994 singles